Despertar contigo (English title: Waking up with you) is a Mexican telenovela produced by Pedro Damián for Televisa. It is a free version of the Colombian telenovela Pobre Pablo. The series originally aired from August 8, 2016 to January 22, 2017

The series is starring Daniel Arenas as Pablo Herminio, Ela Velden as Maia Alcalá, Aura Cristina Geithner as Antonia and Enoc Leaño as Othón.

Plot 
At a flower-growing convention, destiny brings together two young people whose love story begins when they meet. Maia and Pablo come from different social classes. Maia is Othón's oldest and only daughter after losing his son, Gael, in a house fire. Othón is one of the most important entrepreneurs of the flower cultivation and is heavily strict towards her. On the other hand, Pablo is part of the bodyguard squad of Antonia, the rival of Othón ... two people with many account slopes.

And it is because Antonia and Othón have known each other since they were young and do not miss a chance to hurt themselves, Antonia takes advantage of the meeting between Maia and Pablo to deceive Maia by saying that Pablo is one of the most important floriculturists of the country ... a lie whose purpose is not to hurt Maia, who does not care if Pablo is from a rich social class or not, but Othón, who is heavily strict towards Maia, wants her to be married to a wealthy man and would be actually more than destroyed if he knew that she loves a poor man.

But in addition, the love between Maia and Pablo is not only condemned by the entanglements that surround their encounter, but also by their former flames: Cindy and Federico. Cindy, who was Pablo's girlfriend in the past and calls him by his middle name, Herminio, comes back into his life, wanting Pablo back in a desperate and obsessive manner. Meanwhile, Federico is a junior who is with Maia for interest and wants to marry her with Othón's support (who believes that he is a millionaire). Both will do whatever they can to prevent a "stretched" and "naughty" from taking away, what they believe, belongs to them. With making things even worse for both Maia and Pablo, Maia turns out to be pregnant with Pablo's baby and decides to keep this a secret, by claiming that the baby is Federico's.

Bad blood, spite and jealousy are the condiments of this love story, which is born suddenly in the least expected place and tests the ingenuity and decision of Maia and Pablo.

Cast

Main 
 Daniel Arenas as Pablo Herminio Leal Bueno
 Ela Velden as Maia Alcalá González
 Aura Cristina Geithner as Antonia Santamaría
 Enoc Leaño as Othón Alcalá

Secondary 
 Alejandro Calva as Rafael Reyna
 Anna Ciocchetti as Cynthia Madrigal / Isaura Hidalgo de Reyna
 Antonio De Carlo as Rogelio
 Mara Cuevas as Carmen González de Alcalá
 Arturo García Tenorio as Ismael
 Leticia Huijara as Tulia Ventura
 Rodrigo Murray as Eligio Vallejo
 Sara Corrales as Cindy Reyna
 Christian Chávez as Christian Leal
 Estefanía Villarreal as Frida Díaz de la Vega
 Daniel Tovar as Rodolfo Soler
 Eloy Ganuza as Álvaro
 Gonzalo Peña as Federico Villegas
 Marcus Ornellas as Néstor
 Lucas Bernabé as Wilson
 Alejandro Valencia as Ferney
 Roberta Damián as Jenny Paola Leal
 Sebastián Poza as Abel
 Isidora Vives as Rosalía
 Claudia Acosta as Rufina
 Luz Aldán as Flora
 Armando Silvestre as Silvestre Leal

Guest 
 Claudio Báez as El Coronel
 Maluma as Himself

Awards and nominations

References 

Mexican telenovelas
Televisa telenovelas
2016 telenovelas
2016 Mexican television series debuts
2017 Mexican television series endings
Mexican television series based on Colombian television series
Spanish-language telenovelas